Baba Kuhi Bakuvi mosque is one of the oldest mosques in Baku, the capital of Azerbaijan, belonging to the 9th–10th centuries. It is located in the historical part of Icherisheher, north of Maiden Tower. Presumably it is belonged to the Persian scholar and theologian Baba Kuhi Bakuvi.

Discovery 
The mosque was discovered as a result of archaeological excavations carried out between 1990 and 1993 conducted by archaeologist Farhad Ibrahimov. An Arabic inscription was found on the altar of the mosque, written in kufi script and saying, "Power belongs to Allah (God)." This inscription was read by the epigraphist Meshadikhanum Neymat. The paleographic features of the inscription allowed researchers to attribute the monument to the 9th–10th centuries.

As a result of small-scale excavations in 1998, two rooms of the mosque were discovered. The mosque including the adjacent rooms and a colonnade of lancet arches, was a single complex.

Gallery

See also 
 List of mosques in Baku

References 

Mosques in Baku
Icherisheher